Fuck Me I'm Famous is a series of electronic dance music compilation albums by the French DJ David Guetta. His now ex-wife Cathy Guetta collaborated in the production. The first album in the series was released in 2003. The albums have traditionally been released during the summer months of their respective years.

Fuck Me I'm Famous (2003)

The very first volume in the series was issued on July 1, 2003, via Virgin Music. A two-disc edition, including a compilation DVD, was later issued by Ultra Records. "Just For One Day (Heroes)" was released as a single from the album on June 16, 2003.

"Just for One Day (Heroes)" – David Guetta vs. Bowie
"Shout" – E-Funk featuring Donica Thornton
"Shake It" – Lee Cabrera
"Fuckin' Track" – Da Fresh
"Satisfaction" – Benny Benassi
"Distortion" – David Guetta featuring Chris Willis
"Dancing in the Dark" – 4 Tune 500
"Heart Beat" – Africanism by Martin Solveig
"Sunshine" – Tomaz vs. Filterheadz
"Sometimes – Deux
"If You Give Me The Love I Want" – Crydajam
"Ghetto Blaster" – Twin Pitch
"Stock Exchange" – Miss Kittin & The Hacker
"Who Needs Sleep Tonight" – Bob Sinclar
"Bye Bye Superman" – Geyster
"Bucci Bag" – Andrea Doria

 Deluxe edition bonus DVD
 "F.M.I.F Compilation 2003" (Compilation Video)

Fuck Me I'm Famous Vol. 2 (2005)

The second volume in the series was first issued on July 18, 2005, before an expanded version was issued on August 29, 2005, containing two discs, and altering the track listing.

 "Zookey – Lift Your Leg Up" – Yves Larock Feat. Roland Richards
 "Freek U" – Bon Garçon
 "Most Precious Love" – Blaze featuring Barbara Tucker
 "Everybody" – Martin Solveig
 "Pump Up the Jam" – D.O.N.S. featuring Technotronic
 "Geht's Noch" – Roman Flugel
 "Not So Dirty" – Who's Who
 "The World Is Mine" – David Guetta featuring JD Davis
 "Shot Me Down" – Audio Bullys featuring Nancy Sinatra
 "I Like the Way (You Move)" – BodyRockers
 "Say Hello" – Deep Dish
 "In Love With Myself" – David Guetta featuring JD Davis
 "Miss Me Blind" – Culture Club
 "Rock the Choice" – Joachim Garraud
 "Manga" – H Man
 "Louder Than A Bomb" – Tiga
 "The Drill" – The Drill
 "Infatuation" – Jan Francisco and Joseph Armani

International version
 Disc One
 "Most Precious Love" – Blaze & UDA, Barbara Tucker
 "Gabryelle" – DJ Spen & DJ Technic
 "Yeah" – Steve Angello & Sebastian Ingrosso
 "Pump Up The Jam" – DONS & Technotronic
 "Geht's Noch" – Roman Flugel
 "Not So Dirty" – Who's Who
 "The World Is Mine" – David Guetta & JD Davis (FMIF Remix)
 "Miss Me Blind" – Culture Club (David Guetta & Joachim Garraud FMIF Mix)
 "Rock The Choice" – Joachim Garraud (Sebastian Ingrosso Remix)
 "Manga" – H-Man
 "Avalon" – Juliet (FMIF Remix)
 "Drill" – Drill
 "In Love With Myself" – David Guetta (Robbie Rivera Remix)
 "Waiting In The Darkness" – Erick Morillo & Leslie Carter (Harry Romero Remix)

 Disc Two
 "Louder Than A Bomb" – Tiga
 "We Interrupt This Program" – Coburn
 "First Day" – Timo Maas (Buick Project Dub)
 "Wait And See" – Tiefschwarz & Chikinki
 "Sword Fight" – Lower East Side
 "It's Magic" – Fat Phaze (Lottie & Serge Santiago's Mix)
 "Bright Lights Fading" – Slam & Billie Ray Martin
 "Sweat On The Walls" – John Tejada
 "Safari" – Andre Kraml & Schad Privat
 "Du What U Du" – Yoshimoto (Trente Moller Remix)
 "You Made A Promise" – Shiny Grey (FMIF Mix)
 "Believe" – Chemical Brothers
 "Infatuation" – Jan Francisco & Joseph Armani
 "Fast Track" – De Crecy, Etienne & Super Discount 2
 "Closer To Me" – Chab & JD Davis

Fuck Me I'm Famous – Ibiza Mix 2006 (2006)

The third volume in the series was issued on June 26, 2006 via Virgin Records. An international version, containing an extended version of the album, was made available on July 10, 2006, via Ministry of Sound. A DVD accompaniment was released beside the album, however, some editions carry the DVD as a bonus disc. "Love Don't Let Me Go (Walking Away)" was released as a single from the album on August 14, 2006 after its appearance on the Citroën adverts in the United Kingdom.

 "Walking Away" (Tocadisco Radio Edit) – The Egg
 "Love Don't Let Me Go" – David Guetta
 "No More Conversation" – Freeform Five
 "Same Man" (Extended Vocal Mix) – Till West and DJ Delicious
 "Something Better" – Martin Solveig
 "Love Sensation" – Eddie Thoenick and Kurd Maverick
 "World, Hold On – Children of the Sky" – Bob Sinclar
 "In My Arms" (Tocadisco Remix) – Mylo
 "Get It On (Summer Love)" – Joe Vannelli featuring Rochelle Flemming
 "5 in the Morning" – Richard F.
 "The Rub (Never Rock)" – Kurd Maverick
 "Dance I Said" – Erick Morillo and Diddy
 "Toop Toop" – Cassius
 "Fuck Swedish" – Logic
 "Teasing Mr. Charlie" – Steve Angello
 "Time" – David Guetta

International version
 Disc One
 "Love Don't Let Me Go (Walking Away)" – David Guetta
 "Same Man" – Till West and DJ Delicious
 "Ascension" – Denis Naidanow
 "Tell Me Why" – Supermode
 "It's Too Late" – Evermore vs Dirty South
 "World, Hold On – Children of the Sky" – Bob Sinclar
 "You're No Good for Me" – Tocadisco
 "Love Sensation '06" (HI_TACK Burnin' Up Club Mix) – Loleatta Holloway
 "Banquet" (Phones Disco Edit) – Bloc Party
 "5 in the Morning" – Richard F.
 "Otherwize Then" – Steve Angello & Laidback Luke
 "Teasing Mr. Charlie" – Steve Angello
 "World Cup" – Kiko

 Disc Two
 "Get It On (Summer Love)" – Joe Vannelli featuring Rochelle Flemming
 "Save My Soul" – Logic
 "He Is" – Copyright featuring Song Williamson
 "Always and Forever" – Chocolate Puma
 "Luna" – Andy Cato
 "Transatlantic Flight" (Axwell Remix) – Lorraine
 "Last Dub on Earth" (Arnaud Rebotini Remix) – Black Strobe
 "Dance I Said" – Erick Morillo and Diddy
 "Click" – Steve Angello & Sebastian Ingrosso
 "Da Hool" – Da Hool
 "Bleeep!" – Martijn Ten Velden & Lucien Foort
 "Fucking Swedish" – Logic

Deluxe edition bonus DVD
 "Fuck Me I'm Famous" (Documentary)
 "Just A Little More Love" (Music Video)
 "Love Don't Let Me Go" (Music Video)
 "Just For One Day (Heroes)" (Music Video)
 "Money" (Music Video)
 "The World Is Mine" (Music Video)
 "Time" (Music Video)

Fuck Me I'm Famous – Ibiza Mix 2008 (2008)

The fourth volume in the series was first released on June 16, 2008 on Virgin Records, before an international expanded version was released on July 28, 2008, by Ministry of Sound.

 "Keep On Rising" – Ian Carey featuring Michelle Shellers
 "No Stress" – Laurent Wolf featuring Eric Carter
 "Tomorrow Can Wait" – David Guetta & Chris Willis vs. El Tocadisco
 "Sucker" (Fred Pellichero Remix) – Dim Chris
 "Toys Are Nuts" – Gregor Salto and Chuckie
 "Move Move" – Robbie Rivera
 "Outro Lugar" (Tocadisco's Nunca Chove Floripa Mix) – Prok and Fitch present Salomé de Bahia
 "Delirious" (Laidback Luke Remix) – David Guetta featuring Tara McDonald
 "Apocalypse" – Arno Cost and Norman Doray
 "Toca's Miracle" (Inpetto 2008 Mix) – Fragma
 "So Strong" (Inpetto Remix) – Meck featuring Dino
 "Pjanoo" – Eric Prydz
 "Runaway" (Albin Myers Remix) – Tom Novy featuring Abigail Bailey
 "Man with the Red Face" – Mark Knight and Funkagenda
 "Pears" (Vocal) – Federico Franchi
 "The Rock" – Joachim Garraud
 "Jack Is Back" – David Guetta

International version
 Disc One
 "Tomorrow Can Wait" – David Guetta & Chris Willis vs. El Tocadisco
 "Sucker" (Fred Pellichero Remix) – Dim Chris
 "Toys Are Nuts" – Gregor Salto and Chuckie
 "Move Move" – Robbie Rivera
 "Outro Lugar" (Tocadisco's Nunca Chove Floripa Mix) – Prok and Fitch present Salomé de Bahia
 "Delirious" (Laidback Luke Remix) – David Guetta featuring Tara McDonald
 "The One" (Joachim Garraud & David Guetta Remix) – Sharam featuring Daniel Bedingfield
 "3 Minutes To Explain" – Fedde le Grand & Funkerman feat. Dorothy & Andy Sherman
 "Klack" – Who's Who
 "What The F***" – Funkagenda
 "Bleep" – Sandy Vee
 "Radio" (Shinichi Osawa Remix) – Felix da Housecat
 "Jack Is Back" – David Guetta
 "Pears" (Vocal) – Federico Franchi
 "The Rock" – Joachim Garraud
 "Rock 'N' Rave" – Benny Benassi

 Disc Two
 "Pjanoo" – Eric Prydz
 "Runaway" (Albin Myers Remix) – Tom Novy featuring Abigail Bailey
 "Toca's Miracle" (Inpetto 2008 Mix) – Fragma
 "Miracle" (Mischa Daniels Remix) – The Frenchmakers featuring Andrea Britton
 "Golden Walls" – Dahlbäck and Cost
 "TQ" – Arias
 "So Strong" (Inpetto Remix) – Meck featuring Dino
 "Caribe" – Tristan Garner presents Caribe
 "You" – Steve Mac and Paul Harris (FPS Remix)
 "Humanoidz" (Arno Cost & Norman Doray Remix) – Tom De Neef and Laidback Luke
 "Ring Road" (Laidback Luke Remix) – Underworld
 "Beautiful Lie" (Joachim Garraud Remix) – Keemo and Tim Royko featuring Cosmo Klein
 "Man with the Red Face" – Mark Knight and Funkagenda

Fuck Me I'm Famous – Ibiza Mix 2009 (2009)

The Ibiza Mix 2009 was released on August 21, 2009, via Positiva Records. "GRRRR" was released as a single from the album on October 19, 2009. In France, the album was released on June 12, 2009, containing one bonus track and a compilation DVD mix.

 "When Love Takes Over" (Electro Extended Mix) – David Guetta featuring Kelly Rowland
 "Believe" (2009 Remix) – Ministers de la Funk vs. Antoine Clamaran & Sandy Vee feat. Jocelyn Brown
 "Boom Boom Pow" (Electro-Hop Remix) – The Black Eyed Peas
 "Leave The World Behind" – Axwell, Sebastian Ingrosso, Steve Angello, Laidback Luke feat. Deborah Cox
 "Riverside" – Sidney Samson
 "Day 'n' Nite" (Bingo Players Remix) – Kid Cudi vs. Crookers
 "Thief" – Afrojack
 "Let The Bass Kick" – Chuckie
 "My God" – Laidback Luke
 "Rockerfeller Skank" – Fatboy Slim vs. Koen Groeneveld
 "Amplifier" (Club Mix) – F.L.G
 "Where Is Love" – David Guetta ft Max C
 "GRRRR" – David Guetta
 "Cyan" – Arno Cost
 "The Answer" (Dabruck & Klein Extended Remix) – Joachim Garraud
 "Times Like These" (Club Mix) – Albin Myers

 Deluxe Edition Bonus DVD
 "F.M.I.F Summer of Love" (Compilation Video)

Fuck Me I'm Famous – Ibiza Mix 2010 (2010)

The Ibiza Mix 2010 was released on July 26, 2010, via Positiva Records.

 "Gettin' Over You" (Extended) – David Guetta & Chris Willis featuring Fergie & LMFAO
 "On The Dancefloor" (Extended) – David Guetta featuring will.i.am & apl.de.ap
 "Rock That Body" – Black Eyed Peas
 "Flashback" (David Guetta Remix) – Calvin Harris
 "Louder than Words" – David Guetta & Afrojack featuring Niles Mason
 "I'm In The House" (Sharam Lovefest Remix) – Steve Aoki featuring Zuper Blahq
 "Rave'n'Roll" – Steve Angello
 "I'll Be There" – Afrojack & Gregor Salto
 "Walk With Me" (Axwell & Daddy's Groove Remix) – Prok & Fitch
 "50 Degrees" – David Guetta
 "The World Is Yours" – Sidney Samson
 "Who's In The House" (Chuckie Remix) – Chris Kaeser
 "Put Your Hands Up" – Koen Groeneveld & Mark Knight
 "Hey Hey" (Riva Starr Paradise Garage Remix) – Dennis Ferrer
 "Glow" – Cirez D
 "Strobe" – Deadmau5

Fuck Me I'm Famous – Ibiza Mix 2011 (2011)

The Ibiza Mix 2011 was released on July 18, 2011 via Positiva Records.

 "Where Them Girls At" (Nicky Romero Remix) – David Guetta featuring Flo Rida & Nicki Minaj
 "Sweat" (David Guetta & Afrojack Dub Mix) – Snoop Dogg
 "Rapture" (Avicii New Generation Extended FMIF Remix) – Nadia Ali
 "Beautiful People" (Felix Cartal Club Mix) – Chris Brown featuring Benny Benassi
 "Turn Up The Volume" – AutoErotique
 "Pandemonium" – David Guetta & Afrojack featuring Tara McDonald
 "Replica" – Afrojack
 "Little Bad Girl" (Instrumental Club Mix) – David Guetta
 "Detroit Bounce" – Chuckie
 "Duel" – Third Party
 "The Moment" (Steve Angello Edit) – Tim Mason
 "Bassline" – David Guetta
 "Lise" – Arno Cost
 "Sinnerman" – Sean Miller & Daniel Dubb
 "Doin' Ya Thang" – Oliver

Fuck Me I'm Famous – Ibiza Mix 2012 (2012)

The Ibiza Mix 2012 was released on June 29, 2012 via EMI Records.

 "Turn Me On" (Michael Calfan Remix) – David Guetta featuring Nicki Minaj
 "Can't Stop Me" – Afrojack & Shermanology
 "Wild One Two" – Jack Back featuring David Guetta,  Nicky Romero & Sia
 "Million Voices" – Otto Knows
 "Silhouettes" – Avicii
 "The Veldt" – Deadmau5
 "Feel So Close" – Calvin Harris
 "Metropolis" – David Guetta & Nicky Romero
 "Get Low" – Sidney Samson
 "Cascade" – Tommy Trash
 "Greyhound" – Swedish House Mafia
 "Quasar" – Hard Rock Sofa
 "Bong" – Deniz Koyu
 "WTF!?" – Nicky Romero featuring ZROQ
 "I Can Only Imagine" (David Guetta & Daddy's Groove Remix) – David Guetta featuring Chris Brown & Lil Wayne

Fuck Me I'm Famous – Ibiza Mix 2013 (2013)

The Ibiza Mix 2013 was released on June 24, 2013 via EMI Records.

 "Play Hard" (Albert Neve Remix) – David Guetta featuring Ne-Yo & Akon
 "Sweet Nothing" – Calvin Harris featuring Florence Welch
 "I Could Be the One" – Avicii vs. Nicky Romero
 "Easy" – Mat Zo & Porter Robinson
 "If I Lose Myself" – OneRepublic vs. Alesso
 "Symphonica" – Nicky Romero
 "Head Up" – Arno Cost
 "Boom!" – Stevie Mink, Ivan Gough & Steve Bleas
 "Cannonball" – Showtek & Justin Prime / (alternate Version: "Vertigol" – Daddy's Groove & Cryogenix)
 "Ain't a Party" – David Guetta & Glowinthedark featuring Harrison
 "Rasputin" – Hard Rock Sofa
 "Wakanda" – Dimitri Vegas & Like Mike
 "Who" – Tujamo & Plastik Funk
 "This Is What It Feels Like" (David Guetta Remix) – Armin van Buuren featuring Trevor Guthrie
 "Alive" (David Guetta Remix) – Empire of the Sun
 "Dynamo" – Laidback Luke & Hardwell

Charts

References

External links
Official website, by David Guetta 
 Ibiza Frenchy People : le site des francophones à Ibiza

David Guetta albums
2003 compilation albums
2005 compilation albums
2006 compilation albums
2008 compilation albums
2009 compilation albums
2010 compilation albums
2011 compilation albums
2012 compilation albums
2013 compilation albums
Ministry of Sound compilation albums
Dance music compilation albums
Compilation album series